Afrauropodidae is a family of pauropods.

References

External links

Myriapod families